Anne Wyndham (born January 29, 1951) is an American television actress. She is known for playing the title character's daughter Rachel in the television series Barney Miller.

Career 
Born in California. Wyndham began her career in 1972, appearing in the soap opera television series General Hospital. She played the role of Caroline Murray until 1975. Wyndham then made guest-starring appearances in the television programs Kojak, Quincy, M.E., Matt Houston, The Fresh Prince of Bel-Air, Trapper John, M.D., Knight Rider and 21 Jump Street. She joined the cast of the soap opera television series Search for Tomorrow along with Joel Higgins, who played the role of journalist Bruce Carson. She had played the role of Dr. Amy Carson in Search for Tomorrow.

Wyndham joined the cast of the new ABC sitcom television series Barney Miller in 1975. Her final credit was from Passions, where she played the role of Nurse Stevens from 2007.

Filmography

Television

References

External links 

Rotten Tomatoes profile

1951 births
Living people
People from California
Actresses from California
American soap opera actresses
American television actresses
20th-century American actresses
21st-century American actresses